The 2020 Shimadzu All Japan Indoor Tennis Championships was a professional tennis tournament played on indoor hardcourts. It was the second edition of the tournament which was part of the 2020 ITF Women's World Tennis Tour. It took place in Kyoto, Japan between 17 and 23 February 2020.

Singles main-draw entrants

Seeds

 1 Rankings are as of 10 February 2020.

Other entrants
The following players received wildcards into the singles main draw:
  Miyu Kato
  Suzuho Oshino

The following players received entry from the qualifying draw:
  Erina Hayashi
  Chisa Hosonuma
  Kang Jiaqi
  Ari Matsumoto
  Kisa Yoshioka
  Zhang Ying

Champions

Singles

 Xun Fangying def.  Indy de Vroome, 3–6, 6–3, 7–6(8–6)

Doubles

 Erina Hayashi /  Moyuka Uchijima def.  Hsieh Yu-chieh /  Minori Yonehara, 7–5, 5–7, [10–6]

References

External links
 2020 Shimadzu All Japan Indoor Tennis Championships at ITFtennis.com
 Official website

2020 ITF Women's World Tennis Tour
2020 in Japanese tennis
February 2020 sports events in Japan
All Japan Indoor Tennis Championships